Quwo County is a county under the administration of Linfen city, in southern Shanxi Province, China. The county has spans an area of 437 square kilometers, and has a population of 230,000 as of 2013.

History 
From 745 to 677 BC Quwo was a state that broke off from the State of Jin. Quwo County was first set up in 487 CE under the Northern Wei Empire. Since then, the county has not changed its name.

Administrative divisions
The county's government is located within Lechang.

Climate

References

County-level divisions of Shanxi